The 1960 Tour de France was the 47th edition of the Tour de France, one of cycling's Grand Tours. The race featured 128 riders, of which 81 finished.

Because Jacques Anquetil was absent after winning the 1960 Giro d'Italia, Roger Rivière became the main favourite. Halfway the race, Rivière was in second place behind Nencini, and with his specialty the time trial remaining, he was still favourite for the victory. When Rivière had a career-ending crash in the fourteenth stage, this changed, and Nencini won the Tour easily.

Teams

The 1960 Tour de France was run in the national team format. The four most important cycling nations of the time, Spain, Belgium, France and Italy, each sent a national team with fourteen cyclists. There were also five smaller national teams: a combined Luxembourg/Swiss team, a Dutch team, a West German team, a British team, and a team of Internationals cyclists, all with eight cyclists. Finally, there were five regional teams, also of eight cyclists each. Altogether, 128 cyclists started the race. The West German team, that had been away from the Tour since 1938, was allowed to join again.

The teams entering the race were:

 Spain
 Belgium
 France
 Italy
 Switzerland/Luxembourg
 Netherlands
 West Germany
 Internationals
 Great Britain
 West
 East/South-East
 Paris/North
 Centre-Midi

Pre-race favourites

Jacques Anquetil, the winner of the 1957 Tour de France, had won the 1960 Giro d'Italia earlier that year. Anquetil was tired, and skipped the Tour. This made Roger Rivière the French team leader, and the big favourite for the Tour victory.

Route and stages

The 1960 Tour de France started on 26 June in Mulhouse, and had one rest day, in Millau. In previous years, the location of the stage finish and the next stage start had always been close together. In 1960, this changed, when cyclists had to take the train to get from Bordeaux to Mont de Marsan after the ninth stage.

Race overview

The first stage was split in two parts. In the first part, a group of fourteen cyclists cleared from the rest, and won with a margin of over two minutes. In the second part, an individual time trial, Roger Rivière won. The lead in the general classification transferred to Nencini, who had been part of the group of fourteen cyclists. Federico Bahamontes, winner of the 1959 Tour, became ill and left the race in the second stage.

Nencini lost the lead in the third stage to Joseph Groussard. In the fourth stage, a group including Henri Anglade escaped, and Anglade became the new leader. Anglade had already finished in second placed in 1959, and expected to be the team leader now.

In the sixth stage, Rivière attacked. Only Nencini, Hans Junkermann and Jan Adriaensens could follow. Anglade asked his team manager Marcel Bidot to instruct Rivière to stop his attack, because Nencini and Adriaensens were dangerous opponents. Rivière ignored this, and continued. They beat the rest by almost fifteen minutes, and Adriaensens took over the lead in the general classification. After the stage, Anglade said that the French team lost the Tour in that stage. Anglade knew that Rivière would try to stay close to Nencini in the mountains, and warned that Rivière would regret staying close to Nencini downhill.

The first mountains were climbed in the tenth stage. Nencini won time in the descent from the Col d'Aubisque, where Adriaensens could not follow. After the Aubisque, Adriaensens worked together with his teammate Jef Planckaert to win back time, but Nencini was able to stay away from them, and became the new leader, with Rivière in second place, only 32 seconds behind.
Nencini gained one minute on Rivière in the eleventh stage, but Rivière knew he had the stronger team. Moreover, Rivière was at that moment the holder of the hour record, and knew he would win back enough time in the time trial in stage 19.

In the fourteenth stage, descending the Col de Perjuret, Rivière followed Nencini, considered one of the best descenders in the  peloton  but misjudged a turn and went off a cliff. Rivière broke his back in the fall, and never raced again.

Because of this, Jan Adriaensens climbed to the second place in the general classification, and he now was the main competitor for Nencini. Adriaensens lost time in the Pyrenees, and the Italians were able to put Graziano Battistini in second place. In the last stages, there was no competition for the overall victory, because it was clear that Nencini's advantage was too large. Therefore, all cyclists put their energy to win the remaining stages. For the points classification, Jean Graczyk had built a large lead, but the mountains classification was only clinched by Imerio Massignan in the final mountain stage.

In the twentieth stage, news came that Charles de Gaulle, the president, would be by the route at Colombey-les-deux-Églises, where he lived. The organisers, Jacques Goddet and Félix Lévitan asked the French national champion, Henry Anglade, if the riders would be willing to stop. Anglade agreed and the news was spread through the race. One rider, Pierre Beuffeuil had stopped to repair a tyre and knew nothing of the plan, being three minutes behind the race. When he reached Colombey, he found the race halted in front of him. He decided to pass all the waiting cyclists and continued alone, and won the stage alone on the boulevard Jules-Guesde by 49 seconds. "I voted for de Gaulle", he said.

Classification leadership and minor prizes

There were several classifications in the 1960 Tour de France, two of them awarding jerseys to their leaders. The most important was the general classification; it was calculated by adding for each cyclist he times that he required to finish each stage. If a cyclist had received a time bonus, it was subtracted from this total; all time penalties were added to this total. The cyclist with the least accumulated time was the race leader, identified by the yellow jersey.

The points classification was calculated differently than in the years before. The top six cyclists of each stage received points; the winner 10 points, down to 1 point for the 6th cyclist. Because only a few cyclists received points, in the first stages of the Tour de lead was shared by up to 5 cyclists. In stage 4, when Jean Graczyk won the stage, he took the leading, having finished second in the stage 2. Graczyk remained leader for the rest of the race. The leader of the points classification was identified by the green jersey.

The mountains classification was calculated by adding the points given to cyclists for reaching the highest point in a climb first. There was no jersey associated to this classification in 1960.

Finally, the team classification was calculated as the sum of the daily team classifications, and the daily team classification was calculated by adding the times in the stage result of the best three cyclists per team. It was won by the French team. For the smaller teams (made of 8 cyclists), a separate classification was made, here the Dutch team won. The Great Britain team and the Internationals did not finish with three cyclists, so were not included in the team classification.

In addition, there was a combativity award, in which a jury composed of journalists gave points after each stage to the cyclist they considered most combative. The split stages each had a combined winner. At the conclusion of the Tour, Jean Graczyk won the overall super-combativity award, also decided by journalists. The Souvenir Henri Desgrange was given in honour of Tour founder Henri Desgrange to the first rider to pass the summit of the Col du Lautaret on stage 17. This prize was won by Graczyk.

Final standings

General classification

Points classification

Mountains classification

Team classification

Super-combativity award

Aftermath
Rivière survived the crash, but his career as a professional cyclist was over. The drug palfium was found in his pockets, and it was thought that it had so numbed Riviere's fingers so that he couldn't feel the brake levers.
Nencini had his bouquet of flowers given to Rivière.

Notes

References

Bibliography

External links

 
1960
1960 in French sport
1960 in road cycling
June 1960 sports events in Europe
July 1960 sports events in Europe
1960 Super Prestige Pernod